Alfred Angelo Bridal was a manufacturer and retailer of wedding dresses. The company was headquartered in Delray Beach, Florida. While primarily recognized for its wedding dress fashions, the company also designed dresses for bridesmaids, mothers of the bride, flower girls, and also sold wedding accessories.

In 2017, Alfred Angelo abruptly closed all of its store locations and filed for Chapter 7 bankruptcy liquidation.

History 
The company was founded by Alfred Angelo and his wife Edythe Piccione in the mid-1930s in Philadelphia. Edythe designed the dresses and Alfred focused on manufacturing and business development. The company sold bridal and formal attire through its name-brand stores and in partner stores. In the 1980s, the founder's children began managing the company. Dresses were marketed by style and pricing under the labels Alfred Angelo, Sapphire, Modern Vintage, and Disney Fairy Tale collections. The company was featured on a 2013 episode of the television show Undercover Boss.

Bankruptcy 

On July 13, 2017, the company filed for Chapter 7 bankruptcy liquidation and immediately closed all of its stores. One year later, the case was still in court administration with US$20 million in claims from store customers. Much of the inventory was lost to warehouse and shipper's liens. In 2019, the company's total liabilities were reported at $78 million and only $245,000 was raised from a warehouse sale. The intellectual property of the Alfred Angelo labels was bought by a Shanghai-based online retailer.

See also
 Retail apocalypse
 List of retailers affected by the retail apocalypse

References 

Companies based in Philadelphia
Fashion design
Companies that have filed for Chapter 7 bankruptcy
Companies that filed for Chapter 11 bankruptcy in 2017
Wedding dress designers
2017 disestablishments in Pennsylvania
Retail companies established in 1933
Retail companies disestablished in 2017
1933 establishments in Pennsylvania
Defunct retail companies of the United States
American companies established in 1933
American companies disestablished in 2017
Defunct companies based in Florida